Jamie Lucas (born 6 December 1995) is a Welsh footballer who plays for Worcester Raiders as a striker.

Born near Pontypridd, South Wales, Lucas spent one season playing for Bristol Rovers Central in the Midland Junior Premier League, before joining the Under-16s as a schoolboy.

Lucas won the league and cup double for the Under-18s during the 2012-13 campaign, which subsequently earned him a professional contract in the summer of 2013.

Club career
On 21 April, Lucas made his professional debut against Rochdale towards the end of the season. He came off the bench in the 79th minute, replacing Tom Parkes. Rovers lost the game 2–1, which contributed towards their eventual relegation from the Football League - the first time since their acceptance in 1920.

On 8 August, Lucas joined Conference South side Weston-super-Mare on a one-month loan deal. He made his debut the next day in a 1–0 defeat to Bishop's Stortford. His first goal for the Seagulls came in a 3–2 victory over Farnborough on 11 August. On 25 August, Lucas scored his second goal for Weston, which earned his team a 1–0 victory over Staines Town. On 5 September, Rovers agreed to extend Lucas' loan by two months. He went on to score against Hemel Hempstead Town, Ebbsfleet United, and Maidenhead United bringing his tally to five goals in 13 appearances.

On 28 November, Lucas joined Conference North side Gloucester City on loan until the new year. Lucas made six appearances for the Tigers but failed to find the net.

On 12 February, Lucas returned to Weston-super-Mare on loan. Lucas scored his first career hat-trick in a 4–3 win over Bishop's Stortford, a performance that helped him to win Conference South player of the month for February. Lucas' goalscoring form continued with a brace against Havant & Waterlooville followed by goals against both Bath City and Basingstoke Town before his return to parent club Bristol Rovers having scored seven goals in eight appearances during his second Weston-super-Mare spell.

On 7 August, Lucas signed for new National League side Boreham Wood. He made his debut the next day and scored in the 3–1 win over Halifax Town.
After a couple of successful loan spells, Bristol Rovers called Lucas back. Lucas came on as a late substitute against Plymouth Argyle replacing Jermaine Easter. Lucas rejoined Boreham Wood on loan until the end of the season.

After an unsuccessful loan back at Boreham Wood, Lucas joined fellow National League side Woking on loan until the end of the campaign. On 18 March 2017, Lucas made his Woking debut in their 2–1 away defeat against Gateshead, featuring for 58 minutes before being replaced Ben Morris. On 25 March 2017, Lucas scored his first goal for Woking in their 4–2 home defeat against Maidstone United.

On the 28 April 2017, it was announced that Lucas would leave Bristol Rovers at the end of the 2016–17 campaign upon the expiry of his current contract.

On 23 May 2017, Lucas joined National League South side Bath City on a one-year deal. On 5 August 2017, Lucas made his Bath debut during their 3–2 away defeat to newly promoted side Bognor Regis Town, replacing Marvin Morgan in the 63rd minute. Just under a month later, he scored his first goal for Bath during their 1–1 home draw with Welling United, netting their equaliser after Harry Phipps had given the visitors the lead.

Following his release from Bath, Lucas joined National League North side Brackley Town. On 16 December 2017, Lucas made his Brackley debut during their FA Trophy tie against Braintree Town, featuring for 77 minutes in the 0–0 draw.

On 15 June 2018, it was announced that Lucas would return to Weston-super-Mare on a one-year deal.

Following a spell at Evesham United, whilst on loan from Halesowen Town, Lucas returned to The Robins on a permanent basis ahead of the 2020–21 campaign.

On 22 June 2022, after struggling with injury during the 2021–22 campaign, Lucas agreed to join Worcester Raiders.

Career statistics

References

External links
 

1995 births
Living people
Footballers from Pontypridd
Welsh footballers
Association football forwards
Gloucester City A.F.C. players
Bristol Rovers F.C. players
Boreham Wood F.C. players
Woking F.C. players
Bath City F.C. players
Brackley Town F.C. players
Weston-super-Mare A.F.C. players
Halesowen Town F.C. players
Redditch United F.C. players
Evesham United F.C. players
National League (English football) players